Reduced-price meal is a term used in the United States to describe a federally reimbursable meal, or snack, served to a qualified child when the family of the child's income is between 130 and 185 percent of the US federal poverty threshold. Schools may not charge more than US$0.40 for reduced-price lunches, nor more than US$0.30 for reduced-price breakfasts.

See also
School meal programs in the United States
National School Lunch Act

References

United States Department of Agriculture
Education in the United States
School meal programs in the United States